OKG may refer to:
 OKG AB
 Okoyo Airport
 Ornithine α-ketoglutarate